Sarah Hadland is an English actress. She is best known for her role as Stevie Sutton in the BBC One BAFTA-nominated comedy television series Miranda (2009–2015) and Trish in The Job Lot (2013–2015).

Hadland appeared as the Ocean Sky receptionist in the 2008 James Bond film Quantum of Solace. Her other movie roles include Magicians (2007), Leap Year (2010) and Learners (2007). Hadland appeared in the comedy-drama television series Moving Wallpaper (2008–2009) as script writer Gillian McGovern, and had roles in the British comedy TV shows That Mitchell and Webb Look (2008–2010), Horrible Histories (2009, 2012–2013, 2015), The Job Lot (2013–2015) and  Brotherhood (2015). She appeared in the BBC miniseries The Moonstone (2016).

Early life and education
Sarah Hadland was born on February 20, 1971, and trained in dance from the age of three. During her schooling at Wilmslow High School in Cheshire, she became involved in amateur dramatics with Tempo youth group in Wilmslow. Following training at the Laine Theatre Arts College in Epsom, Surrey, she began her theatre career at the age of 19, appearing in musicals such as Cats and Grease in London's West End.

After six years, she transferred to touring theatre, including performances in Who's Afraid of Virginia Woolf?. During this period, she began to develop her talents as a voiceover artist, with credits including the white kitten in the Catsan commercial, squeaking: "I can't find my litter tray"; and the America surfer girl in a VO5 shampoo advert, who says: "It's great for my body." She provided additional voice work for the PlayStation 2 video game Dragon Quest VIII.

Career
Hadland's television career began with supporting roles in Bad Girls and The Bill, before she moved on to bigger roles in comedies Green Wing and Broken News. She also starred in the films Confetti and Magicians alongside comedians David Mitchell and Robert Webb, and BBC One's Learners. She also played characters for their comedy sketch show  That Mitchell and Webb Look. In November 2009, Hadland joined Miranda Hart in the BBC comedy series Miranda, based upon the BBC Radio 2 series Miranda Hart's Joke Shop and featuring the same principal actors.

From 2007, she has also had a recurring role in the BBC Radio 4 comedy series Bleak Expectations, a parody of Charles Dickens's novels, and of Victoriana in general. Hadland provided the voice of Lily (née Bin) Sourquill, the daughter of Sir Philip ('Pip') Bin over the four series to date. She also voiced the characters Ripely Fecund (Pip's third wife, in series 2) and Miss Christmasham (a parody of Great Expectations''' Miss Havisham, in series 3).

In 2011, Hadland was cast as the new English teacher, Linda Radleigh, in the BBC drama Waterloo Road.
She also starred in Horrible Histories on the channel CBBC between 2009 and 2015. From 2013 to 2015, Hadland appeared as Trish in the ITV sitcom The Job Lot, set in a busy unemployment bureau in the West Midlands. On May 22, 2021, Hadland appeared on Saturday Kitchen, where she revealed that her ‘food heaven’ was truffles, and her ’food hell’ was aubergines, courgettes and oysters.

Filmography
Films

Television

Video games

TheatreAdmissionsCatsGreaseTime and the ConwaysWho's Afraid of Virginia Woolf?What's in a Name?Radio appearancesMr and Mrs Smith – Annabelle (series 1) – 2012Births, Deaths and Marriages – Lorna (series 1 and 2) – 2012That Mitchell and Webb Sound (series 4) – 2009Edge Falls – Valerie (series 1 and 2) – 2008Miranda Hart's Joke Shop – Stevie Sutton – 2008Bleak Expectations – Lily, Sir Phillip's daughter; Ripely Fecund, Pip's third wife (series 2–5) and Miss Christmasham (series 3) – 200720 Cigarettes'' – Lisa/Michelle/Caroline – 2006

References

External links

Living people
Actresses from London
English film actresses
English stage actresses
English television actresses
English video game actresses
English voice actresses
20th-century English actresses
21st-century English actresses
1971 births